Kambuzia Partovi (also spelt Kambozia Partovi, ; 11 November 1955 – 24 November 2020) was an Iranian film director and screenwriter.

Biography
He was born in Rasht, Iran, on the Caspian Sea. After studying theater arts in school he wrote mainly scripts for TV series.

In 1988 he made his feature film debut with Golnar. His 2007 film Café Transit, which received the special mention at Mar del Plata film festival, was selected by Iran as its candidate for the Academy Award for Best Foreign Language Film.

He wrote screenplays for other directors, most notably Jafar Panahi's The Circle. In 2013 he acted in and co-directed Closed Curtain with Panahi. Partovi trained and supported many Iranian artists and film makers, most notably Bahman Ghobadi.

He died on 24 November 2020, of complications from COVID-19.

Filmography

Director
1988 Golnar
1990 The Singer Cat
1991 The Fish
1992 The Adult Game
1994 The Legend of Two Sisters
1997 Naneh Lala va farzandanash
2005 Café Transit
2013 Closed Curtain (co-directed with Jafar Panahi)

Screenwriter
2000 The Circle
2015 Muhammad (together with Majid Majidi)

Awards and honors
 UNICEF Award (1989)
 FIPRESCI Prize (2006)
 Special Mention at Mar del Plata Film Festival (2006)

See also 
Persian cinema

References

External links

1955 births
2020 deaths
Iranian film directors
Iranian screenwriters
People from Rasht
Crystal Simorgh for Best Screenplay winners
Deaths from the COVID-19 pandemic in Iran